"Ride It" is the first single from Jay Sean's second album My Own Way and is also featured on his US debut album All or Nothing. It was written by Jay Sean himself and Alan Sampson, and produced by the latter. It was released on 21 January 2008. The song reached the top 20 in the UK Singles Chart, peaking at number 11. The single was also very successful and one of the most played songs in Eastern Europe, particularly in Russia, Bulgaria and Romania, where it became one of the top three best-selling singles of the year. A Hindi version of the song was also included in the Indian release of the album My Own Way.

In 2019, a reworked version by Kosovo-Albanian DJ Regard was officially released and became a viral hit on the TikTok app. It reached number one in Ireland, number two on the UK Singles Chart and also peaked at number three in Australia.

Information
"Ride It" was originally planned to be released in the United Kingdom on 5 November 2007 followed by the album My Own Way on 3 December 2007. However, music channels were unwilling to play it at the time and eventually reached an agreement to play it extensively from December onwards. Consequently, Jay Sean pushed back the single's release date as well as the album's release date.

The song, produced by Alan Sampson, became Song of the Week on London's Kiss FM on 10 December 2007 and was also playlisted on Capital FM, Choice FM, Galaxy, BBC Radio 1Xtra, and being featured on BBC Radio 1's B-list. It reached the number one spot on MTV's The Base Chart Show. Later, a Hindi version of the song was added to YouTube.

The intro and the epic melody background was based on the Hero soundtrack by Tan Dun. Some of the scenes in the video were shot in Manhattan.

Music video

The video for the single was shot on 12 August 2007 in the central London nightclub Mo*Vida. On 28 September 2007, the video was exclusively available to watch on 3G mobile handsets and on 9 October 2007 was officially released to the internet by 2Point9 Records. The new video featured Jay Sean with a new style after being out of the limelight for nearly three and a half years.
On 28 September 2007, the video was exclusively available to watch on 3G mobile handsets. A clip of the video was added to the 2Point9 YouTube Channel on 29 September 2007.

By 9 October 2007, the full video was added onto the 2Point9 YouTube Channel. The video premiered on The Box and other music channels in December. It starts off with Jay Sean arriving outside a club, the video is interspersed with a scene of Jay in a dark hallway. He flirts with a woman played by the British Victoria's Secret model, Anara Atanes and then a dance ensues, the video ends with the girl arriving by his side.

Formats and track listings

Charts

Weekly charts

Year-end charts

Certifications

Regard version

Kosovo-Albanian DJ Regard officially released a reworked version of the song on 26 July 2019, though earlier versions of the song were available as early as 2017. It became a viral sensation on the TikTok app shortly after release, with over four million clips being posted by people using snippets of the song on the app. Due to the sudden success of the song, Regard subsequently signed to the label Ministry of Sound. The song was a global success, reaching number one in Ireland and Mexico, number two in the UK and peaked within the top 20 in various other European and Oceanian countries. It was certified silver by the BPI.

Regard does not appear in the music video, directed by Meji Alabi. The music video was shot in Ukraine; its cast includes English dancer and actor Harry Parr.

Live performances
Regard performed the song with Jay Sean at the 2019 Jingle Bell Ball held by Capital FM at The O2 Arena in London on 7 December 2019.

Charts

Weekly charts

Year-end charts

Certifications

References

2008 songs
2008 singles
2019 singles
Jay Sean songs
Regard (DJ) songs
Irish Singles Chart number-one singles
Songs written by Jay Sean
2Point9 Records singles
Ministry of Sound singles
Songs written by Alan Sampson